Statistics of the Scottish Football League in season 1896–97.

Overview
Hearts were champions of the Scottish Division One.

Partick Thistle won the Scottish Division Two. Both Linthouse and Port Glasgow Athletic had four points deducted.

Scottish League Division One

Scottish League Division Two

See also
1896–97 in Scottish football

References

 
1896-97